Ratanska Vas is a settlement immediately north of Rogaška Slatina in eastern Slovenia. The entire area of Rogaška Slatina is part of the traditional region of Styria. It is now included in the Savinja Statistical Region.

References

External links
Ratanska Vas on Geopedia

Populated places in the Municipality of Rogaška Slatina